V Shape Mind was an American alternative rock band. They released one major label album in 2003 before disbanding the following year.

Background

V Shape Mind was formed in 1999 and toured the local Illinois metal scene, during which they self-released an EP titled Metric in 2000. The band was discovered by renowned producer David Bottrill, who got them signed to Universal Records.

The band released their debut album, Cul-De-Sac, on September 9, 2003. The single "Monsters" features vocals from  Mudvayne's Chad Gray and received considerable radio play. Despite touring with such acts as Mudvayne and Powerman 5000, V Shape Mind struggled to gather any mainstream attention. Consequently, they have since broken up, pointing to difficulties with Universal Records as the key factor. They played their final show together on Thursday, May 6, 2004 at Lincoln Square Theater in their hometown of Decatur, Illinois.

Members

 Brad Hursh – vocals, guitar
 Jeff McElyea – guitar, piano
 Vic Zientara – bass, backup vocals
 Scott Parjani – drums, percussion (deceased 1/3/2010)

Discography

Albums

Studio albums

Extended plays

Singles

External links
 V Shape Mind at AllMusic

References

Musical groups from Illinois
Musical groups established in 1999
Musical groups disestablished in 2004
Decatur, Illinois
1999 establishments in Illinois